Alien Carnage, originally released as Halloween Harry, is a side-scrolling platform game developed by Interactive Binary Illusions and SubZero Software, and distributed by Apogee Software. The game features 256-colour VGA graphics and background music in MOD format. Alien Carnage is composed of four episodes. The first episode was released as shareware, and the rest were distributed commercially. In May 2007, John Passfield and 3D Realms released Alien Carnage as freeware. In 2014, the game was re-released with Windows support.

Plot
The cartoon-style game features agent Halloween Harry, who has to save the world from aliens that want to take control of Earth by turning its population into green-skinned zombies. Some of the enemies reference Aliens, Gremlins, and Elvis Presley. Harry is helped by controller Diane, who gives him information via a video link.

Gameplay

In the game, the player has to shoot zombies and aliens with his flamethrower and other weapons, rescuing hostages along the way. Instead of jumping, Harry uses a jetpack to reach higher platforms. His jetpack shares ammo with his flamethrower, which means it is best for the player to use both sparingly. Harry can eat and drink junk food to gain health (rescuing hostages also restores Harry to full health), and upgrade to different kinds of ammo by using ammo dispensers. The player needs to collect coins dropped by killed enemies to buy this ammo. They can also pick up other power-ups with various effects, including a wrapped gift (additional ammo for Harry's current weapon), a money bag (30 additional credits; coins dropped by enemies are worth 5 credits each), and a 1-up icon (an extra life, plus full health). The game progress can be saved through the use of computer terminals scattered across the levels. To advance to the next level, Harry needs to rescue all the hostages, then use the elevator.

Development

Alien Carnage was originally titled Halloween Harry, and was released under this title for its first two versions. After v1.2, Apogee suggested to the developers that the title should be changed because it might be viewed as a seasonal Halloween-themed game, limiting sales during the rest of the year. They renamed it to Alien Carnage, and it was re-released as "Alien Carnage v1.0" in 1994. Along with the name change, missions one and three were switched, and with Apogee's shareware model, this meant that half of the game could be played for free.

Halloween Harry was originally written and released commercially in 1985 by John Passfield as a game for the Australian Microbee computer system.

Legacy
In 1996 a sequel called Zombie Wars was released. This game takes place three years after the original story. The aliens return to Earth to try to enslave its population. Harry and Diane, who has been promoted to field agent and is now also a playable character, have to save the world again. A number of other friendly characters have been added as NPCs.

Gee-Whiz Entertainment (formerly Interactive Binary Illusions) made plans for an animated cartoon based on the third, future Alien Carnage game. The cartoon was to include Harry and Diane, the NPCs, as well as probably recurring alien and zombie characters. The script was roughly based on the script for Zombie Wars, but both the game and the cartoon were never made.

References

"Apogee Legacy" interview with John Passfield

External links
Alien Carnage page at 3D Realms
Alien Carnage freeware

DOS games
Platform games
Windows games
1993 video games
Apogee games
Video games developed in Australia
Freeware games
Side-scrolling video games
Halloween video games
Video games about zombies
Video games set in 2030
Single-player video games
Alien invasions in video games